Crack the Skye is the fourth studio album by American heavy metal band Mastodon, released on March 24, 2009, through Reprise, Sire and Relapse Records. The album debuted at number 11 on the Billboard 200, selling 41,000 copies in its first week. In Australia, the album debuted at number 19. It had sold 200,000 copies in the US as of September 2010, making it one of their highest-selling albums to date.

According to an interview on the DVD The Making of Crack the Skye, this album represents the element of aether, which is represented by the souls and spirits of all things, a theme closely related to the context of the album. Because the elements of fire, water and earth have already been represented by the band's first three albums Remission, Leviathan, Blood Mountain and the band's seventh album Emperor of Sand, respectively, the element of air is the only classical element which has yet to be represented by a Mastodon album, as their follow-up studio albums The Hunter and Once More 'Round the Sun do not represent an element, nor are they concept albums.

Crack the Skye is the first studio album to feature drummer Brann Dailor as the band's third lead vocalist.

Musical and lyrical themes

Drummer Brann Dailor described the album as more "focused" than its predecessor, Blood Mountain: "Maybe there was a deeper heart to this record that needed more exploring ... We got more involved with feeling the vibe of the record and everything feels more creepy and spaced out and something special is going on." During the composition of the record, Brent Hinds listened to In the Court of the Crimson King by King Crimson every day as inspiration, while Dailor and Troy Sanders listened to Pink Floyd's Animals.

Vocalist/bassist Troy Sanders said in an interview with Stereogum, "Crack the Skye is a departure from everything we've previously recorded in the sense that we kinda strapped on our aeroshells and departed from Earth for a while, and then captained to the ethereal element of the universe and kind of slept on the roof of the world for a while to get a perspective on this record. ... Basically we're exploring the ethereal world. We're dissecting the dark matter that dominates the universe, in a nutshell."

When asked in multiple interviews Dailor said the record would tell a story dealing variously with the art aesthetics of Tsarist Russia, astral travel, out of body experiences and Stephen Hawking's theories on wormholes.

Dailor has also said that "Crack the Skye" is meant as a homage to his sister, Skye Dailor, who committed suicide at age 14.

Scott Kelly, who guested on the title track, has this to say about the song:

Packaging
Paul Romano, who had done all of Mastodon's album artwork to that point, created the art for Crack the Skye. The piece features various ethereal images tied in closely with the overall concept of the record. Crack the Skye was released in two editions: the standard and limited edition. The latter has an elaborate packaging with a tunnel book that, when looked through, reveals three-dimensional-like imagery. A "hidden" picture of Brann Dailor's sister, Skye, can be seen on both sides of the tunnel book as well.

Release
Crack the Skye has been released as standard CD version and CD/DVD version, which included a bonus DVD with a documentary and a track commentary. Furthermore, standard single-disc LP and limited-edition 2xLP were released. A "super-deluxe" CD/DVD version that includes a tunnel book and a lithograph of the album art sold out during pre-orders, and a "Royal Edition" with a CD of the instrumental versions of the songs and an entirely new black-and-gold artwork was released on December 15, 2009.

Critical reception

The initial critical response from music critics to Crack the Skye was very positive. At Metacritic, which assigns a normalized rating out of 100 to reviews from mainstream critics, the album has received a score of 82, based on 29 reviews, indicating "Universal Acclaim".

Amongst the positive reviews received from critics was Total Guitar Nick Cracknell who awarded the album a 5/5 rating, describing it as "even more ambitious in scope and sound than 2006's Blood Mountain. Embracing elements of prog and country, but above all classic rock, Hinds and Kelliher literally add new dimensions to the band's ever-expanding sound." Decibel, who named Blood Mountain as their number 1 album of 2006, gave Crack the Skye a 7/10 rating as reviewer Joe Gross responded that "Crack is clearly designed as a grower, not a shower, the sound of a band that grew tired of people not responding to their ground game, so they put the ball in the air. Who knows when it will come down?" Clash review was particularly glowing in its praise for the album, saying "no metal release of 2009 is likely to be as important as Crack the Skye." The review praised the album's expansive sound and emotion, and finished by claiming that the album is "surely destined to become the stuff of legend". Reviewer Nate Chinen of The New York Times noted the album's "ambitious vision and vivid execution". The New Yorker pop music critic Sasha Frere-Jones lists it as one of his favorite albums of the year on his personal blog and, in an article for The New Yorker, called Crack the Skye a "deeply entertaining album".

Accolades

Crack the Skye was named amongst the most well received albums of 2009 by numerous music publications. Classic Rock magazine placed it a No. 3 of its Top Albums of 2009, while Kerrang! place it at No. 4 in its Top Albums of 2009. Time magazine placed "Crack the Skye" at No. 3 on its Top 10 Albums of 2009 list, and Rock Sound named it their Album of the Year for 2009. In addition, Spin magazine listed it as the 17th best album of the year. Rhapsody called it the 7th best album of 2009. The album was also voted the No. 1 Album of 2009 by Metal Hammer critics and contributors. In 2014, TeamRock put Crack the Skye at No. 57 on their Top 100 Greatest Prog Albums of All Time list, commenting: "Mastodon's 2009 album has the blood and thunder from previous releases, but takes everything to a new musical level. A restive and sophisticated piece of work from the prog heavyweights". The album was honored with a 2009 Metal Storm Award for Best Alternative Metal Album.

Track listing

CD/DVD
 The Making of Crack the Skye – exclusive behind-the-scenes documentary
 Track-by-track commentary – video commentary of the album by the band
 Photo gallery – slide of various images from the band

Personnel
Mastodon
 Brann Dailor – drums, percussion, backing vocals, co-lead vocals on "Oblivion" and "Crack the Skye"
 Brent Hinds – lead guitar, banjo, co-lead vocals except on "Karelia" and "Crack the Skye"
 Bill Kelliher – rhythm guitar
 Troy Sanders – bass, bass synth, co-lead vocals, lead vocals on "Karelia"

Other
 Rich Morris – keyboards, synth and mellotron
 Scott Kelly  – lead vocals on "Crack the Skye"
 Brendan O'Brien – production, mixing, backing vocals

Charts

Certifications

References

External links

Mastodon (band) albums
2009 albums
Reprise Records albums
Rock operas
Concept albums
Albums produced by Brendan O'Brien (record producer)